Colorable or colourable may refer to:

 Graph coloring in Mathematics
 In law, that a legal burden of proof would be met at trial